Oromo may refer to:
 Oromo people, an ethnic group of Ethiopia and Kenya
 Oromo language, an Afroasiatic language
 Oromo (dish), a Central Asia food item

See also

Oromia Region

Language and nationality disambiguation pages